
Trützisee is a lake above Geschinen in the Canton of Valais, Switzerland.

See also
List of mountain lakes of Switzerland

Lakes of Valais